Kuebunyane Airport  is an airstrip serving the Basotho villages of Kuebunyane in Mohale's Hoek District, Lesotho.

The runway is on a ridge above a river valley, with no overrun on the east end. There is high terrain in all quadrants.

See also

Transport in Lesotho
List of airports in Lesotho

References

External links
 HERE Maps - Kuebunyane
 OpenStreetMap - Kuebunyane
 Flying into Kuebunyane - MAF YouTube

Airports in Lesotho